Robin Hood is a comic opera by Reginald De Koven (music), Harry B. Smith (lyrics) and Clement Scott (lyrics of "Oh Promise Me").  The story is based on the Robin Hood legend, during the reign of King Richard I (1189-1199 AD).  The opera was composed in Chicago, Illinois during the winter of 1888-1889.

The opera was first performed at the Chicago Opera House on 9 June 1890.  It was produced by the Boston Ideal Opera Company, also known as the Bostonians.  The opera opened in New York at the Standard Theatre on September 22, 1891 and was produced in London at the Prince of Wales Theatre in 1891 with a new title, Maid Marian.  It was revived at the Knickerbocker Theater on Broadway on April 30, 1900.  Other Broadway revivals were in 1902 at the Academy of Music, in 1912 at New Amsterdam Theatre with Walter Hyde in the title role, in 1918 at the Park Theatre, in 1929 at the Casino Theatre and Jolson's 59th Street Theatre, in 1932 at Erlanger's Theatre, and in 1944 at the Adelphi Theatre.

In 2004 Ohio Light Opera produced the opera based on a new critical edition of the opera that it commissioned from Quade Winter, based on the composer's original manuscripts in the Library of Congress.  A complete CD recording was issued by Albany Records.

Synopsis
The opera is set in the late 12th century during the reign of King Richard I.

Act 1
In the market square in Nottingham, England, villagers are celebrating the first day of May.  Friar Tuck tells how he sells clothing and other goods ("As an Honest Auctioneer").  Annabel and the milkmaids are happy with their lives ("Milkmaids' Song"), but Allan-a-Dale notes that milkmaids are overworked. Robin Hood and his archers arrive and tout their ideal life in the woods ("Come the Bowmen in Lincoln Green"); they are welcomed to an archery contest. Robin notices Annabel, and Allan-A-Dale quickly questions his motives, as Allan loves Annabel. Annabel, Allan, Robin and the outlaw Little John consider the fickle nature of love. Maid Marian enters in disguise as a page boy to see Sir Guy of Gisborne, the ward of the Sheriff of Nottingham ("I Came as a Cavalier"). The Sheriff has arranged a marriage between Guy and Marian. Marian reveals herself to Robin and the reasons for her disguise, and the two fall in love ("Come Dream So Bright").

The Sheriff appears and boasts of his plans ("I am the Sheriff of Nottingham"). Sir Guy and the Sheriff plot how Guy will ask Marian to marry him (When a Peer Makes Love to a Damsel Fair). Robin and the bowmen return, pleased about the prizes they won in the archery contest. Because Robin is to receive his inheritance today, they go to the Sheriff's residence, knock on the door, and demand that the Sheriff declare Robin Hood's title of Earl, with its title to his land,and cash. The Sheriff refuses all demands and produces forged documents stating that Sir Guy is the Earl. Little John invites Robin to join the jolly outlaws in Sherwood, and Robin and his friends agree.

Act 2
In Sherwood Forest, Robin Hood and his friends have gathered ("O Cheerily Sounds the Hunter's Horn", "Brown October Ale" and "Oh, Promise Me"). Dame Durden sees the Sheriff and believes him to be her long lost husband whom she had believed died in battle. She begs him to return to her, and he hesitatingly plays along, although he does not intend to return. The Sheriff realizes that the outfit he is wearing is stolen, and he would have to therefore put himself in jail if found out. Guy, the Sheriff and the tinkers discuss the tinkers' life (The Tinkers' Song"). Robin, Guy, the Sheriff and Robin's men consider their situations ("Oh, See the Lambkins Play").

Marian dreams of Robin ("Forest Song"). Annabel loves and is devoted to Allan-A-Dale but is frustrated by Allan's jealousy. Robin and Annabel discuss a plan for him to serenade Annabel during the evening to pique Allan's jealousy. The Sheriff makes his affections for Annabel known. Marian offers to take Annabel's place that evening, and Robin sings a serenade, "A Troubadour Sang to His Love".  The Sheriff, who was pursuing Robin's followers as outlaws, is captured by them. Dame Durden sees the Sheriff and begs him to come back to her, but he insists he is not her husband. The Sheriff finally admits he is a thief, and Dame Durden notes his plight. But Sir Guy arrives with soldiers and overpowers Robin's men. Robin points out that they are powerless over him, due to the king's edict, but he Sheriff replies that the edict applies to Guy (since he is the Earl of Huntington), not Robin, and states that Guy will be Marion's husband.

Act 3
In the courtyard of the Sheriff's castle, Will Scarlet and the blacksmith discuss their lives ("The Armourer's Song"). Annabel woefully considers her imminent wedding to the Sheriff (When a Maiden Weds"), and Allan-a-Dale anticipates Robin's funeral ("The Legend of the Chimes)".  Robin and Marian sadly pledge their love for each other ("Love, Now We Nevermore Will Part"). The Sheriff, Friar Tuck, Sir Guy, Annabel and Dame Durden discuss the "pangs" of life ("When Life Seems Made of Pains and Pangs"). In the courtyard of the castle, Robin and his men find King Richard, who has arrived home from the Crusades. Robin receives a pardon from King Richard and the return of his land and title. Marian and Robin are now able to marry, as are Annabel and Allan-A-Dale. Everyone is joyful about their freedom.

Notes:  "Oh Promise Me" was not part of the original opera, but was written in 1887 by De Koven to lyrics written by English poet and critic Clement Scott and published as a separate art song in 1889. The piece is used in Act 3, sung at the wedding of Robin Hood and Maid Marian, but in the 1891 version it was sung in Act 2 by Allan-A-Dale between "Brown October Ale" and the "Tinkers' Song".

Characters
 Robert of Huntington (Robin Hood) (tenor)
 The Sheriff of Nottingham (baritone)
 Sir Guy of Gisborne, a ward of the sheriff (tenor)
 Little John, outlaw (baritone)
 Will Scarlet, outlaw, blacksmith and armorer (bass)
 Friar Tuck, outlaw clergyman (bass)
 Allan-A-Dale, outlaw, in love with Annabel (contralto)
 Lady Marian Fitzwalter (Maid Marian) (soprano)
 Dame Durden, a widow (mezzo-soprano)
 Annabel, Durden's daughter, in love with Allan-A-Dale (soprano)
 Chorus

Musical numbers
Act 1
Auctioneer's Song – Annabel, Alan-a-Dale, Little John, Will Scarlet, Friar Tuck and Chorus
Milkmaids' Song – Annabel, Alan-a-Dale and Milkmaids
Come the Bowmen in Lincoln Green – Annabel, Dame Durden, Alan-a-Dale, Robin Hood, Archers, Milkmaids and Chorus
I Come as a Cavalier – Maid Marian
Come Dream So Bright – Maid Marian and Robin Hood
I Am the Sheriff of Nottingham – Guy of Gisborne, Sheriff of Nottingham and Chorus
When a peer makes love to a damsel fair – Sheriff of Nottingham, Guy of Gisborne, Maid Marian and Chorus

Act 2
Oh cheerily soundeth the hunter's horn – Alan-a-Dale, Little John and Will Scarlet
(Song of) Brown October Ale – Little John and Male Chorus
Oh, Promise Me (lyrics by Clement Scott) – Alan-a-Dale
The Tinkers' Song – Guy of Gisborne, Sheriff of Nottingham and Tinkers
Oh, see the lambkins play – Robin Hood, Guy of Gisborne, Sheriff of Nottingham, Little John, Friar Tuck and Will Scarlet
Forest Song (Ye Birds in Azure Winging) – Maid Marian

Act 3
The Armorer's Song – Will Scarlet
When a Maiden Weds – Annabel
The Legend of the Chimes – Alan-a-Dale and Chorus
Love, Now We Nevermore Will Part – Maid Marian and Robin Hood
When life seems made of pains and pangs – Annabel, Dame Durden, Guy of Gisborne, Sheriff of Nottingham and Friar Tuck

Notes

References
 Schleifer, Martha Furman (ed.). Three Centuries of American Music, G.K. Hall & Co. 1990, Vol, 5, pp. xxvii and 106–330.
 Kinscella, Hazel Gertrude. Music and Romance, pp. 385–386.

External links

Robin Hood Broadway productions at the IBDB database
Piano-vocal score at Archive.org
Robin Hood music digitized as MIDI files

English-language operettas
Depictions of Robin Hood in music
Operas set in England
1890 operas
Operas